Austin McCrabb (born 27 January 1965) is a former Australian rules footballer who played with Geelong and Hawthorn in the Victoria/Australian Football League (VFL/AFL).
 
McCrabb, a defender, played under 19s football for Fitzroy but it was from Colac that he was recruited to Geelong. He only came close to playing a full season once, when he made 15 appearances in the 1990 AFL season.

Following the end of his AFL career, McCrabb switched to Victorian Football Association (VFA) club Sandringham, playing in their 1994 premiership side.

References

Sources
 Fiddian, M. (2016) The VFA: A history of the Victorian Football Association 1877 - 1995, Melbourne Sports Books: Melbourne.

External links
 
 

1965 births
Living people
Australian rules footballers from Victoria (Australia)
Geelong Football Club players
Hawthorn Football Club players
Colac Football Club players
Sandringham Football Club players